Baridhara DOHS is a  neighborhood in Baridhara, Dhaka, Bangladesh . It is beside Gulshan, and is described as prominent.

History
It was built on flood plains, which may potentially make the building in the area vulnerable to earthquakes. There is a mosque in Baridhara DOHS. Inspire is a creative space in DOHS where you can practice yoga. Baridhara DOHS Convention Centre is located here.

References

Neighbourhoods in Dhaka
Dhaka
Dhaka Division geography stubs
DOHSes in Dhaka